NBL TV is an Australian subscription-based internet television channel, operated by the National Basketball League, which is available worldwide through the League's official website. The channel holds rights to not only the NBL, but a number of other basketball leagues and competitions worldwide too. Replays are available for all games after their completion.

Platforms 
 NBL App (mobile and tablet)
 nbl.tv (website)

Broadcast Rights 
 National Basketball League (Australia)
 National Basketball League (New Zealand) 2017 Season
 Chinese Basketball Association 2017 Season (Finals only)
 Liga ACB 2017 Season (Select Real Madrid and FC Barcelona games only)
 NBL All-Australian Team V China series 2017
NBL All-Australian Team Tour of China 2018
 Brisbane Bullets V China game 2017
NBLxNBA 2017 (Replays only)
EuroLeague (from 2019-20 season)
EuroCup (from 2019-20 season)

See also

List of sports television channels
National Basketball League

References

External links

National Basketball League (Australia)
Sports television in Australia
2012 establishments in Australia
Television channels and stations established in 2012
Australian streaming companies
Internet television channels